Frontiers Media SA is a publisher of peer-reviewed, open access, scientific journals currently active in science, technology, and medicine. It was founded in 2007 by Kamila and Henry Markram, and has since expanded to other academic fields. Frontiers is based in Lausanne, Switzerland, with other offices in London, Madrid, Seattle and Brussels. In 2022, Frontiers employed more than 1,400 people, across 14 countries. All Frontiers journals are published under a Creative Commons Attribution License.

Frontiers journals are included in the Directory of Open Access Journals (DOAJ). Frontiers is also a member of the Open Access Scholarly Publishers Association (OASPA), a participating publisher and supporter of the Initiative for Open Citations, and a member of the Committee on Publication Ethics (COPE). As of 2022, Frontiers publishes over 185 academic journals, including 48 journals indexed within the Science Citation Index Expanded, and 4 journals indexed within the Social Sciences Citation Index, with a total of 51 journals ranked with an impact factor.

In 2015, Frontiers Media was classified as a possible predatory publisher by Jeffrey Beall.

History 
The first journal published was Frontiers in Neuroscience, which opened for submission as a beta version in 2007. In 2010, Frontiers launched a series of another 11 journals in medicine and science. In February 2012, the Frontiers Research Network was launched, a social networking platform for researchers, intended to disseminate the open access articles published in the Frontiers journals, and to provide related conferences, blogs, news, video lectures and job postings.

In February 2013, the Nature Publishing Group (NPG) (now Nature Research) acquired a controlling interest in Frontiers Media, however collaboration between the Nature Publishing Group and Frontiers ended in 2015.

Frontiers for Young Minds was launched in November 2013 during the Annual Meeting of the Society for Neuroscience in collaboration with NPG as a web-based science journal that involves young people in the review of scientific articles with the help of scientists who act as mentors.
 
In early September 2014, Frontiers received the ALPSP Gold Award for Innovation in Publishing from the Association of Learned and Professional Society Publishers.

In October 2015, Frontiers (in collaboration with NPG) launched Loop, a research network that is open to be integrated into any publisher's or academic organization's website, and Loop soon included a collaboration with ORCID to link and synchronize researcher profile information. The Technical University of Madrid was the first university to link their Loop profile to their institutional website.

In 2019, Frontiers joined the Initiative for Open Citations.

In May 2020, Frontiers Media launched its Artificial Intelligence Review Assistant software to external editors. The software helps identify conflicts of interest and plagiarism, assesses manuscript and peer review quality, and recommends editors and reviewers, although the software does not flag all forms of conflict of interest, such as undisclosed funding sources or affiliations.

In 2022, a group of publishers including Frontiers Media joined the International Association of Scientific, Technical, and Medical Publishers' STM Integrity Hub, an initiative to provide publishers with tools to combat journal article submissions with integrity issues from research paper mills.

List of journals
The Frontiers journals use open peer review, where the names of reviewers of accepted articles are made public. 

In February 2016, the series contained 54 journals, a number that grew to more than 80 by 2020. The collection of all the journals in the series is sometimes considered a megajournal, as is the BioMed Central series. Some journals, such as Frontiers in Human Neuroscience or Frontiers in Microbiology are considered megajournals on their own. The journals published by Frontiers are:

as well as

Indexing and abstracting 

The National Publication Committee of Norway has assigned Frontiers Media an institutional-level rating of "level 0" in the Norwegian Scientific Index since 2018, indicating that the publisher is "not academic", however individual Frontiers journals have separate journal-level ratings. As of 2022, 96 Frontiers journals are listed in the Norwegian Scientific Index, of which 2 have a rating of "level 2" (top 20% of all journals in their field), over 88 have a rating of "level 1" (standard academic), 1 has a rating of level X (possibly predatory), and 5 have a rating of "level 0" (not academic).

As of 2022, Frontiers publishes over 185 academic journals, including 48 journals indexed within the Science Citation Index Expanded, and 4 journals indexed within the Social Sciences Citation Index, with a total of 51 journals ranked with an impact factor. Furthermore, as of 2021, 9 Frontiers Media journals have been selected for inclusion in MEDLINE.

In broader databases, Frontiers has over 130 journals indexed in the Directory of Open Access Journals (DOAJ), over 60 journals listed in PubMed Central (PMC), over 70 journals listed in Scopus and over 65 journals indexed in Web of Science.

Controversies

Editorial concerns 
In May 2015, Frontiers Media removed the entire editorial boards of Frontiers in Medicine and Frontiers in Cardiovascular Medicine after editors complained that Frontiers Media staff were "interfering with editorial decisions and violating core principles of medical publishing". In total 31 editors were removed. Following this incident, Nature Publishing Group ended its collaboration with Frontiers with the intent "never to mention again that Nature Publishing Group has some kind of involvement in Frontiers."

In June 2015, Retraction Watch referred to the publisher as one with "a history of badly handled and controversial retractions and publishing decisions".

According to researchers referenced in a 2015 blog post quoted by Allison and James Kaufman in the 2018 book Pseudoscience: The Conspiracy Against Science, "Frontiers has used an in-house journals management software that does not give reviewers the option to recommend the rejection of manuscripts" and the "system is setup to make it almost impossible to reject papers".

In 2017, further editors were removed, allegedly for their rejection rate being high. In December 2017, Adam Marcus and Ivan Oransky of Retraction Watch wrote in the magazine Nautilus that the acceptance rate of manuscripts in Frontiers journals was reported to be near 90%.

In 2022, the editors of a special issue with the online journal Frontiers in Research Metrics and Analytics voiced their concerns about the editorial practices at Frontiers, including flaws in the peer review process, unwillingness to discuss these concerns, and forbidding the editors from writing about their concerns in the editorial of the special issue.

In January 2023, Zhejiang Gongshang University (浙江工商大学) in Hangzhou, China, announced it would no longer include articles published in  Hindawi, MDPI, and Frontiers journals when evaluating researcher performance.

Inclusion in Beall's list 
In October 2015, Frontiers was added to librarian Jeffrey Beall's list of "Potential, possible, or probable" predatory open-access publishers. The inclusion was met with backlash among some researchers. Daniël Lakens, researcher at the Eindhoven University of Technology, said "articles people have published in Frontiers are no longer judged based on their own quality, but are now seen as less valuable because Frontiers is on Beall's list". At the time, the Committee on Publication Ethics (COPE) said that "there have been vigorous discussions about, and some editors are uncomfortable with, the editorial processes at Frontiers" but that "the processes are declared clearly on the publisher's site and we do not believe there is any attempt to deceive either editors or authors about these processes". Frontiers is a COPE member and one of its employees sits on COPE's council.

In July 2016 Beall recommended that academics not publish their work in Frontiers journals, stating "the fringe science published in Frontiers journals stigmatizes the honest research submitted and published there", and in October of that year Beall reported that reviewers have called the review process "merely for show". Beall deleted his blacklist in January 2017.

In September 2016, Frontiers demanded that the university where Beall worked force him to retract his claims. Pressure by Frontiers was reported to be a large factor in the controversial shutdown of Beall's List.

Controversial articles 
In April 2013, Frontiers in Psychology retracted a controversial article linking climate change denialism and "conspiracist ideation"; the retraction was itself also controversial and led to the resignations of at least three editors.

In late September 2014, Frontiers in Public Health published a controversial article that supported HIV denialism; three days later the publisher issued a statement of concern and announced an investigation into the review process of the article. It was eventually decided that the article would not be retracted but instead was reclassified as an opinion piece. It has since been retracted.

In November 2016, a paper in Frontiers in Public Health linking vaccines to autism was provisionally-accepted, then retracted. Public criticism noted the paper relied on flawed methodology for reliable results, basing its conclusions only on an online questionnaire, filled in by 415 mothers of school children who self-reported whether their children had neurolodevelopmental disorders, and their vaccination status.

In 2021, a provisionally accepted controversial paper in Frontiers in Pharmacology on COVID-19 and the use of the antiparasitic drug ivermectin was ultimately rejected by the editors as it contained "unsubstantiated claims and violated the journal's editorial policies". This drew anger from the authors of the paper, who called the move "censorship". Retraction Watch noted that this was not the first time Frontiers provisionally accepted and then rejected a controversial paper.

A study published in Frontiers in Virology in February 2022 said that Moderna had patented a 19 nucleotide genetic sequence uniquely matching a part of the SARS-CoV-2 spike protein three years prior to the pandemic, arguing it was evidence that the virus was manufactured as part of a lab leak conspiracy. The study has been widely derided for its misunderstanding of statistical likelihood, particularly as the 19 nucleotide sequence is not unique to SARS-CoV-2, and is also found in organisms like bacteria and birds. Craig Wilen, an immunobiology professor of the Yale School of Medicine, likened the study to "complete garbage" and a "conspiracy theory" rather than legitimate research.

References

External links

 

Publishing companies established in 2007
Swiss companies established in 2007
Open access publishers